Benoît Jacquot (born 5 February 1947) is a French film director and screenwriter who has had a varied career in European cinema.

Life and career 
Born in Paris, Jacquot began his career as assistant director of Marguerite Duras films, including Nathalie Granger, India Song, and also actor in the 1973 short film La Sœur du cadre.

He turned to writing and directing with the 1975 film The Musician Killer, which starred Anna Karina.

He has directed over forty films, the most notable of which to American audiences are La Désenchantée (1990), starring Judith Godrèche, and A Single Girl (1995), starring Virginie Ledoyen.

In 2003, he directed Massenet's opera Werther conducted by Antonio Pappano at Royal Opera House, Covent Garden.

His film Farewell, My Queen opened the 62nd Berlin International Film Festival in February 2012.

His 2014 film Three Hearts competed for the Golden Lion at the 71st Venice International Film Festival.

Filmography

As filmmaker

As actor

Other awards
2012: René Clair Award

References

External links 
 

1947 births
Living people
Film directors from Paris
French male screenwriters
French screenwriters
French-language film directors